Vobbia is a comune (municipality) in the Metropolitan City of Genoa in the Italian region Liguria, located about  northeast of Genoa.   
Vobbia borders the following municipalities: Busalla, Carrega Ligure, Crocefieschi, Isola del Cantone, Mongiardino Ligure, Valbrevenna.

See also
 Parco naturale regionale dell'Antola

References

External links
 Official website

Cities and towns in Liguria